Sofie Reimers (19 April 1853 – 9 April 1932) was a Norwegian stage actress. She was recognized for her performances in both major tragedies and comedies.

Biography
Petra Sophie Alette Christine Reimers was born in Bergen, the daughter of  Claus Severin Frimann Reimers (1808–70) and Severine Cathrine Lem (1816–96). She made her stage debut  as Svanhild in  Kjærlighedens Komedie by Henrik Ibsen at Den Nationale Scene on October 31, 1879. She later  performed at Christiania Theatre from 1881  and at Nationaltheatret from 1899 until her death, being the theatre's "Grand Old Lady".  She continued her legacy from the 19th century during her last performance at the Nationaltheatret on March 10, 1932, where she played Klara Song in Over Ævne I by Bjørnstjerne Bjørnson. She published her memoir Teaterminder fra Kristiania Teater in 1919 and died in 
Oslo during 1932.

References

1853 births
1932 deaths
Norwegian stage actresses
Norwegian memoirists
Actors from Bergen
Women memoirists